Torqabeh District is a district (bakhsh) in Torqabeh and Shandiz County, Razavi Khorasan province, Iran. At the 2006 census, its population was 28,503, in 7,818 families. The district has one city: Torqabeh. The district has two rural districts (dehestan): Jagharq Rural District and Torqabeh Rural District.

References 

Districts of Razavi Khorasan Province
Torqabeh and Shandiz County